|}

The Hilary Needler Trophy is a conditions flat horse race in Great Britain open to fillies aged two years only.
It is run at Beverley over a distance of 5 furlongs (1,006 metres), and it is scheduled to take place each year in late May or early June.

The race was awarded Listed status in 2001 but was downgraded in 2011.

The race was first run in 1965.  The sponsor, Mrs Hilary Needler, died in 2012.

Winners since 1988

See also 
Horse racing in Great Britain
List of British flat horse races

References

Racing Post:

Flat races in Great Britain
Beverley Racecourse
Flat horse races for two-year-olds
Recurring sporting events established in 1965
1965 establishments in England